Sotiris Moustakas (17 September 1940 – 4 June 2007) was a Greek Cypriot actor born in Kato Platres, Limassol. His acting career lasted for over four decades, with 1960s–80s as his most successful years. He was described as an "Actor without a Label" cause of his variety of playing in theatrical plays (many different genres), films, television movies, television series, videotape/videocassette movies and many more with great reviews and success in all of them. He became internationally famous with his role "Mimithos" in 1964 Oscar-winning film Zorba the Greek. After that he became a national star in Greece, being part of the Golden Age of the Greek Cinema (1950s–1970s). His last cinema performance was in 2007 Goya Award-winning film El Greco, where he played "Titian". He gave his voice in the Greek dub of 2007 Disney film Meet the Robinsons, as his last role. He mainly played comedy roles throughout his career. Moustakas was regarded as one of the greatest Greek comedian actors in history.

Early life
He was born in Kato Platres of Limassol District, in British Cyprus. He was the youngest of seven siblings.

Career 
One of the most significant comic actors of Greece and Cyprus, Moustakas graduated from the National Theater of Greece and was known for his portrayal of offbeat, neurotic yet likable characters. In many of his movies he portrayed multiple roles. He appeared primarily in modern films and plays, although he also performed several roles in classical works.

Moustakas' international film debut came in 1964 in the Oscar-winning Zorba the Greek starring Anthony Quinn, in which he played Mimithos, the village idiot. For that film Moustakas lost his Academy Award nomination for Best Supporting Actor only for two more minutes of filming. As Moustakas said, they had filmed many more minutes of playing, but they didn't put all the scenes on the film's final cut.

Although his recent work was mainly in the theatre, he also had a role in the 2007 film El Greco.

Political activities 
Although not widely advertised, Moustakas in his youth was involved in the Greek Cypriot national liberation struggle of EOKA against British colonialism, acting as a messenger, and writing political graffiti. During that period, he was arrested by the British and spent 7 months in jail.

Death 
Moustakas felt unwell during rehearsals for an upcoming Aristophanes play, and was transferred to the General State Hospital of Athens. He was taken to the intensive care unit, where he died in the early morning hours of 4 June 2007. In recent years he suffered from cancer. At his funeral, his coffin was draped with a Greek flag.

Personal life
He was married to the Greek actress Maria Bonellou, with whom he has a daughter, Alexia. His wife, Maria, died on August 30, 2007, due to Alzheimer, at the age of 66, about 3 months after the death of Sotiris.

Selected filmography 

 Zorba the Greek (1964) (a.k.a. Alexis Zorbas, USA) .... Mimithos
 To Prosopo tis imeras (1965)
 Beethoven kai bouzouki (1965) .... Orfeas
 Une balle au coeur (1966) (a.k.a. A Bullet Through the Heart, (International: English title), a.k.a. Devil at My Heels (USA), a.k.a. Mia sfaira stin kardia (Greece))
 Na zi kaneis i na mi zi? (1966) .... Solomon
 Fos... Nero... Tilefono, Oikopeda me doseis (1966) .... Krikor
 Fifis, o aktypitos (1966) .... Michalios Yatayanakis
 Kalos ilthe to dollario (1967) .... Henry
 Martha (1967) .... Hector (uncredited)
 O Modistros (1967) .... Stefanos
 O Kosmos trellathike... (1967) .... Pythagoras
 O Hazobabas (1967) .... Doctor
 Kolonaki: Diagogi miden (1967) .... Pavlos Aspromallis
 I Kori tis Pentagiotissas (1967)
 Gia tin kardia tis oraias Elenis (1967) (a.k.a. Theotrella neiata... xemoramena geramata), (Greece: reissue title))
 Erotes sti Lesvo (1967) (a.k.a. O Thanatos ehase to paihnidi, (Greece))
 Adiki katara (1967)
 Athina, i klopi tis odou Stadiou (1968) (a.k.a. Nude as a Trap) .... Sotos
 Tha ta kapso, ta lefta mou (1968) .... Kleon Karapanos
 Ta Psihoula tou kosmou (1968)
 O Tsahpinis (1968) .... Kosmas
 O Petheropliktos (1968) .... Lavredis
 Oi Mnistires tis Pinelopis (1968) .... Filippos
 O Boufos (1968) .... Dinos Zafiriou
 Pethaino kathe ximeroma (1969)
 I Oraia tou kourea (1969) .... Thomas
 Xypna koroido (1969) .... Faidonas Tramountanas
 H omorfh kai o tzanabetis (1969)
 Fovatai o Yannis to therio (1969) (a.k.a. Tha pao stin zougla me ton Tarzan) .... Anastasis
 Ena asteio koritsi (1970) .... Antonio
 To Paidi tis mamas (1970) .... Fotis
 O Ahaireftos (1970) .... Miltos Kourkoutoulis
 I Tyhi mou trelathike (1970) .... Liakos
 Anastenazoun oi penies (1970) .... Manolios
 Arhipseftaros (1971) .... Paminos
 Thymios enantion Tsitsou (1971) (a.k.a. Dyo sainia, Ta (Greece: TV title)  ... a.k.a. Thymios enantion olon (Greece: TV title) .... Timolis
 Oi Andres xeroun n' agapoun (1971) (a.k.a. To timima tis agapis, (Greece: video box title)
 Gia mia choufta Touristries (1971) .... Police Officer
 Enas nomotagis politis (1974) .... Grigoris Monahogios
 Gynaikes sta opla (1979) .... President
 O Parthenokynigos (1980) .... Iraklis
 Kathenas me tin trella tou... (1980) .... Sotiris
 Gefsi apo Ellada! (1980) .... Hungry Man
 To Megalo routhouni (1981) .... Alexandros / Thiseas Doxapatris
 I 'Nona''' (1981) (a.k.a. Nona enantion mafiozou, (Greece: video title)) .... Thiseas Doxapatris / Nona
 Pater Gomenios (1982) .... Menios
 O Kamikazi tsantakias (1982) .... Poseidonas
 Ego... kai to pouli mou (1982) (a.k.a. Knock out ston erota, (Greece: TV title) .... Kokos
 To Psonio (1983) .... Sotiris Haritos
 To Paizo kai poly andras (1983) .... Zinon Petridis
 Kai aftos to violi tou (a.k.a. "An itan to violi pouli) (1984)... Lefteris Paganikskis
 Mitsos, o rezilis (1984) (a.k.a. O Glykopseftis, (Greece: TV title)) .... Mitsos
 Ta Touvla (1985) .... Sotos Stournos
 O Roz gatos (1986) .... Archimidis Mantouvalos / Efterpi
 O Dynasteias (1986) .... Bebis Karinkopoulos / Dionisakis 'Tarzan' Karinkopoulos / Odysseas
 Merikes ton protimoun... ilektroniko (1986) .... Telis / Paraskevas
 O Petheropliktos (1987) .... Iakovos
 Sexy batsos kai skliros (1987) .... Sotiris Sotiriou / Antonis Kourouflexis
 O Tsitsiolinos (1987) .... Lefteris Spanomarias
 Kourio o Periklis (1987) .... Periklis
 Erastis gia 11 nihtes (1988) .... Angelos Klapsopoulos
 Varis glykos kai meraklis (1988) .... Aristeidis
 Enas trelos tha mas sossei (1988) .... Timolaos
 Andrea prohora (1988)
 Diariktis me to zori (1988) .... Michalis Papadimitrakopoulos
 Tolmi kai afassia (1988) .... Aristeidis Antoniou
 Mhn to paizeis ypourge! (1988)
 Peinasmenos kai jenleman (1989) .... Sotiris
 O Jogadoros (1989) .... Nektarios Bataktsis
 Mia treli treli nychta (1989) .... Sokratis Leonardos
 Kapetan Fortounas (1989) .... Manolis
 O Alepous (1990) .... Alepous
 Kavafis (1996)
 Mila mou kai mantarinia (1999)
 Oi Aparadektoi (1 episode) - Epitheorisi (????) TV Episode
 Petsi kai kokali (2000, TV Movie)
 Me ti ginaika tou filou mou (2000)
 armege lagous kai koureve helones (2000)
 Ti vraki tha paradossis mori? (2001, TV Movie)
 Ta Haidemena paidia (2001, TV Series) .... Nikiforos A
 O haros vgike pagania (2003)
 Emeis xasan autoi masan (2003)
 Kai fagane autoi kala kai emeis heirotera (2005)
 El Greco'' (2007) .... Titian (final film role)

Awards

External links
 Sotiris Moustakas passes away
 Veteran Greek comic actor Sotiris Moustakas dies at 67
 Sotiris Moustakas: "Fought in EOKA" - Excerpts from his famous interview where he describes his life during the EOKA national liberation struggle

References 

1940 births
2007 deaths
Greek male film actors
Cypriot people of the EOKA
Greek male television actors
Greek comedians
Greek people of Cypriot descent
Deaths from cancer in Greece
20th-century comedians
People from Limassol District